Ali Hedyeh-ye Pain (also Romanized as ‘Alī Hedyeh-ye Pā’īn; also known as ‘Alī Hedyeh-ye Soflá, 'Alī Hadīyeh, and Ali Hedyeh Pa’in) is a village in Doreh Rural District, in the Central District of Sarbisheh County, South Khorasan Province, Iran. At the 2006 census, its population was 111, in 29 families.

References 

Populated places in Sarbisheh County